Kelsall is a surname, possibly derived from the English village of the same name. Notable people with the surname include:

Freda Kelsall (born 1938), an English scriptwriter, theatre director and former teacher
Frederick Kelsall (1906–1931), an English rugby league player
John Kelsall (1947–1986), an English composer
Karen Kelsall (born 1962), a Canadian gymnast, dancer, and chiropractor
Moultrie Kelsall (1901–1980), a Scottish actor
Phil Kelsall (born 1956), an English organist
Sam Kelsall (born 1993), an English cricketer
Thomas Forbes Kelsall (1799–1872), an English lawyer and literary figure